Shreveport Central Station is a historic train station in Shreveport, Louisiana. It was built in 1910 by the Louisiana and Arkansas Railroad, a railroad that was eventually acquired by the Kansas City Southern Railway. (However, the KCS used Union Station ever since 1909.) By the opening of the 1940s the L&A and the St. Louis Southwestern Railway or 'Cotton Belt' moved its passenger operations from Central Station to Shreveport Union Station.

Historical recognition
The building, along with an adjoining small freight depot shortly north of it, was listed on the National Register of Historic Places in 1991 as the Central Railroad Station.

The former station currently survives as a gay bar and dance club.

See also
National Register of Historic Places listings in Caddo Parish, Louisiana

References

Shreveport
Buildings and structures in Shreveport, Louisiana
Former Kansas City Southern Railway stations
National Register of Historic Places in Caddo Parish, Louisiana
Railway stations in the United States opened in 1910
Individually listed contributing properties to historic districts on the National Register in Louisiana